John Criswick (born December 1, 1963) is a Canadian entrepreneur.

Career 
After receiving his electrical engineering degree from the University of British Columbia in 1986, Criswick worked as a software engineer for Canadian Astronautics (purchased by EMS Technologies). In the early 1990s, Criswick studied space physics at York University and while obtaining his Master's degree, he worked at an observatory in Utah. In 1991 he attended International Space University in Toulouse, France, immersed in a multidisciplinary program of study centered on space technology.

In 1997, Criswick was contracted by Nortel Networks to source an Internet browser that was agile enough to work on a mobile device. When he discovered there was nothing compatible on the market, he and colleague Bob Tennant began to build a browser from scratch. Nortel agreed to fund the project, and by the end of 1997, Criswick and Tennant had decided to form their own company, Beduin Communications. Nortel became Beduin's first customer, paying $120,000 for a license to use the technology and in 1998, Beduin Communications' personal Java browser technology was purchased by Sun Microsystems for $20 million U.S. in stock (which subsequently more than tripled in value). In 2001, he co-founded Rove Mobile (previously known as Idokorro Mobile and Planetfred), a company that specialized in network administration and remote access solutions for handheld devices.

Over the span of his career, Criswick leveraged his serial entrepreneurship to bring nearly $250 million to Eastern Ontario’s economy. John Criswick’s primary objectives have shifted from consumer tech to consumer goods. During his career, Criswick became an investor and has been involved in starting and operating over 45 companies, many of which are based in or near Ottawa. Below are just a few of them:

 Zucotto Wireless: in 1999 Criswick funded and co-founded this Java-On-A-Chip startup based in Ottawa and San Diego, with Mark Wells at the helm.
 Magmic: In 2002, he co-founded Magmic Games, a smartphone game publisher. At its peak, Magmic had 110 employees and generated approximately 10 million dollars in game sales.
 Top Shelf Distillers: This Perth-based creative distillery is currently his primary endeavor. The company was founded in 2014, and launched the #moretrees campaign in 2018 - 1 tree is planted for each bottle sold.
 Upper Narrows Retreat: Resource-rich 560-acre remote retreat center, in pre-launch phase to become a mountain biking experience destination. Launching in 2022. 

John Criswick participated in the sale of multiple companies with which he was involved, including:

 Beduin Communications Corp.
 Planetfred: Became Idokorro then became Rove Mobile
 Black Sumac: with Russel Ure

Below are more companies John Criswick owns or has been involved with:

 Merigo: Seed stage investor for this social gaming company in San Francisco.
 Speechfront: Brief investment from which he exited in 2000.
 Mekka: Entertainment company.
 NuJazz Chronicles
 Smoke Labs: Game studio from which multiple web media companies were managed. 
 Chronicle Road: Software built for tracking human exercise incorporating social network features. Was created for the first GPS-enabled mobile handset, which was a Blackberry model. Mostly used for cycling and running, using GPS data. 
 Pretzil: Gamer avatar platform with over a million users at its peak - gamer social network.
 Beagle Sense: Home environment monitoring sensors.
 Mercury Lounge: Owner of Byward Market hotspot which has been at the heart of Ottawa's downtown nightlife scene for almost two decades, encompassing an international mix of live music and DJ parties. 
 Overkill Bar: Owner of this underground lounge below Mercury Lounge.
 Arthur Limited: Men’s apparel line.
 Ottawa International Game Conference: Launched and operated an annual game industry conference for 4 years. This was an undertaking to get key industry participants to come together and promote the city as a game development hub.
 Ottawa International Music Conference 
 Makerspace North: 19,000 square feet of harmonious mixed-use space taking the form of an industrious workshop, start-up incubator, and community hub.
 CNC Ottawa: Founded in 2015, CNC Ottawa has played a role in the region’s growing manufacturing sector. For over 6 years, it successfully offered a full spectrum of CNC (Computer Numeric Control) services, including CNC routing, wood cutting, engraving and design.

Philanthropy 
Criswick's primary charity motivation is astronomy and space research as a means to spark interest in young minds' pursuit of higher education. His main interest is the University of Victoria's department of Physics and Astronomy.

Additional Facts 
The main-belt asteroid named 29348 Criswick, discovered in 1995 by David D. Balam, is named after him.

Criswick was among the first to sign up for one of Virgin Galactic's trips to space, which brought him coverage in The Globe and Mail and on CTV's Canada AM show.

References 

Hum, Peter. Rocket Man. Ottawa Citizen, Thursday, September 28, 2006
Software developer presents UVic with astronomical gift, The Ring, University of Victoria,  Jan 5, 2001
JPL Small-Body Database Browser on 29348 Criswick
Article on BlackBerryCool

External links 
Magmic Games
Rove Mobile
Mercury Lounge

Canadian businesspeople
1963 births
Canadian computer programmers
Living people